Mapoyo, or Mapoyo–Yavarana, is a Carib language spoken along the Suapure and Parguaza Rivers, Venezuela. The ethnic population of Mapoyo proper is about 365. Yabarana dialect is perhaps extinct; 20 speakers were known in 1977. An additional dialect, Pémono, was discovered in 1998.  It was spoken by an 80-year-old woman and has since gone extinct.

Phonology

Consonants 

 /h/ can be heard as a palatal [ç] when preceding a voiceless plosive.
 /n/ can be heard as a velar [ŋ] when preceding a velar /k/.
 /β/ can be heard as a voiced stop [b], when after a voiceless plosive or glottal /ʔ/.
 /s/ can be heard with an allophone of [ts] when word-initially, or after a glottal /ʔ/.
 /j/ can be heard as a voiced fricative [ʝ], when before a back vowel.

Vowels 

 Sounds /i, u/ are reduced to [ɪ, ʊ] in syllable-final position.
 /ɘ/ is heard as a lower [ə] sound when preceding /h/, or following /β/.
 /a/ is heard as [ɑ] when occurring after an initial bilabial sound.

References

 Granadillo, Tania. 2019. El mapoyo y la rama venezolana de lenguas caribes. Cadernos de Etnolingüística, volume 7, número 1, julho/2019, p. 43-55.

External links
 Yabarana word list

Languages of Venezuela
Extinct languages of South America
Languages extinct in the 1990s
Languages extinct in the 2000s
Cariban languages